Margarita Iosifovna Vorobyova-Desyatovskaya (28 January 1933 – 13 June 2021) was a Russian Orientalist best known for her research on Central Asian manuscripts in the Sanskrit, Khotanese and Scythian languages. She retired as Curator of Central Asian manuscripts at the Institute of Oriental Studies, Saint Petersburg.

Life
Margarita Vorobyova-Desyatovskaya was born in Leningrad in 1933. She took her Indologist husband, Vladimir Vorobyov-Desyatovsky's last name upon marriage.

In 1950, she began studies at the Indian department of the Oriental School of the Leningrad State University, transferring to the Leningrad branch of the Russian Academy of Sciences' Institute of Oriental Studies. She obtained her candidate of science degree in 1966 with a dissertation on Tibetan grammar.

She worked as a senior researcher in the Tibetan division of the school, later joining the South and South-east Asian division. From 1982 to 2005, she was the head of the department of manuscripts of the school. 

Her jubilee was celebrated in the Institute in 2013. She retired in 2014. 

Vorobyova-Desyatovskaya died on 13 June 2021 at the age of 88.

Academics
Vorobyova-Desyatovskaya focussed on Buddhist manuscripts as well as documents in Sanskrit, Khotanese and Scythian languages from East Turkestan, which were brought to Russia by 19th century expeditioners such as Sergey Oldenburg, Mikhail Mikhailovich Berezovsky and  Pyotr Kozlov. Manuscripts were also obtained from Khara-Khoto and Dunhuang. These formed the basis for the large collection of Central Asian manuscripts in the Institute of Oriental Studies.

Vorobyova-Desyatovskaya published inscriptions from the Kara Tepe Buddhist monastery near Termez, as well as Mahayana texts from Turfan. She also published the Bairam-Ali manuscripts from the Merv oasis, a collection of Jataka-type tales in the Brahmi script dated to between the 2nd and 5th centuries AD.

Selected works

Monographs

Articles

References

External links 
 M. Vorobyova-Desyatovskaya at the Institute of Oriental Manuscripts

Academic staff of Saint Petersburg State University
1933 births
2021 deaths
20th-century Russian historians
21st-century Russian historians
Russian women historians
Saint Petersburg State University alumni
Soviet orientalists
Russian orientalists